Opuntia erinacea, the Mojave prickly pear, variously treated as a species, or as a variety of Opuntia polyacantha, in the family Cactaceae, that is a distributed throughout the Mojave and into the southern Great Basin deserts.

Opuntia erinacea is proposed by A.D. Stock to be an allopolyploid that resulted from hybridization between Opuntia diploursina and Opuntia basilaris.; although ties with other varieties of Opuntia polyacantha are also strongly evident.

References

erinacea
Cacti of the United States